Khaitan Sporting Club (Arabic: نادي خيطان الرياضي)  is a Kuwaiti professional football club named after Khaitan, a suburb of Kuwait City. Khaitan is the first Kuwaiti club to win the Division One title.

Hounors
 Kuwaiti Division One: Winners 2
 1965–66, 1970–71
 Kuwait Crown Prince Cup: Runners-up 1
 2011
 Kuwait Federation Cup: 1
 1974–75

FIFA World Cup and AFC Asian Cup players
FIFA World Cup 1982 

Muayad Al-Haddad
1984 AFC Asian Cup 

Muayad Al-Haddad
2004 AFC Asian Cup 

Hussain Mustahil

Sponsors 
  Health House Nutrition

Khaitan
Football clubs in Kuwait City
Association football clubs established in 1965
1965 establishments in Kuwait
Sports teams in Kuwait